The 2009 United States Olympic Curling Team Trials were held from February 21 to 28, 2009 at the Broomfield Event Center in Broomfield, Colorado. Trials have been held ever since curling returned to the Olympics as a demonstration sport in 1988. The trials also constituted the 2009 United States National Curling Championships.

The winning men's and women's teams represented the United States at the 2010 Winter Olympics and the 2009 men's and women's World Championship.

Men

Teams
The teams are listed as follows:

Round robin standings

Round robin results

Draw 1
Saturday, February 21, 20:00

Draw 2
Sunday, February 22, 12:00

Draw 3
Sunday, February 22, 20:00

Draw 4
Monday, February 23, 12:00

Draw 5
Monday, February 23, 20:00

Draw 6
Tuesday, February 24, 14:00

Draw 7
Wednesday, February 25, 8:00

Draw 8
Wednesday, February 25, 16:00

Draw 9
Thursday, February 26, 8:00

Tiebreaker
Thursday, February 26, 4:00 pm

Playoffs

1 vs. 2
Friday, February 27, 12:00 pm

3 vs. 4
Friday, February 27, 12:00 pm

Semifinal
Friday, February 27, 8:00 pm

Final
Saturday, February 28, 3:00 pm

Women

Teams
The teams are listed as follows:

Round robin standings

Round robin results

Draw 1
Saturday, February 21, 16:00

Draw 2
Saturday, February 22, 8:00

Draw 3
Saturday, February 22, 16:00

Draw 4
Sunday, February 23, 8:00

Draw 5
Sunday, February 23, 16:00

Draw 6
Monday, February 24, 10:00

Draw 7
Monday, February 24, 19:00

Draw 8
Tuesday, February 25, 12:00

Draw 9
Tuesday, February 25, 20:00

Playoffs

1 vs. 2
Thursday, February 26, 8:00 pm

3 vs. 4
Thursday, February 26, 8:00 pm

Semifinal
Friday, February 27, 4:00 pm

Final
Saturday, February 28, 10:00 am

References

Curling United States
United States Olympic Curling Trials
United States Olympic Curling Trials
United States National Curling Championships
Curl
United States Olympic Curling Trials
Women's curling competitions in the United States
Curling in Colorado